Vittorio Corona (9 May 1947 – 24 January 2007) was an Italian journalist.

Born in Aci Trezza, Sicily, Corona began his career in 1993. His brother was the journalist Puccio Corona (1942–2013) and his son is thef photographic agent Fabrizio Corona (born 1974).

Vittorio Corona died following a long illness on 24 January 2007, aged 58, in Milan, Lombardy.

References

1948 births
2007 deaths
People from Aci Castello
Journalists from Sicily
Italian male journalists
20th-century Italian journalists
20th-century Italian male writers